Tyrese Jammal Rice (born May 15, 1987) is an American-born naturalized Montenegrin former professional basketball player who last played for AEK Athens of the Greek Basket League and the Basketball Champions League. He also represents the senior men's National Team of Montenegro. Rice played college basketball with the Boston College Eagles.

Early life and high school
Rice was born in Salisbury, North Carolina, to Allison Rice and Wayne Jefferson. His parents ended their relationship soon afterward. Rice attended L. C. Bird High School in Chesterfield, Virginia, and played on the school's basketball team. In his junior and senior seasons, he earned AAA All-State honors from the Virginia High School Coaches Association. In the 2004–05 season, he led his team to a school-record 29 wins and a Central Region title, their first ever. Rice averaged 27.0 points, 6.2 assists and 5.0 rebounds per game that season. He earned 2004–05 Associated Press (Virginia) Co-Player of the Year honors and was named (Richmond) Times-Dispatch Player of the Year.

Collegiate career
Rice signed his letter of intent to play basketball at and attend Boston College on April 28, 2005. As a freshman (2005–06), Rice played in all 36 games, averaging 9.3 points, 1.4 rebounds and 2.5 assists per game. He earned two ACC rookie honors: ACC Rookie of the Week on November 28, 2005 and was named to the ACC All-Freshman team. In his sophomore season (2006–07), Rice started all 33 games, averaging 36.6 minutes a game. He finished the season with stats of 17.6 points, 3.4 rebounds and 5.4 assists per game. Rice was named to the All-ACC second team, and garnered All-Tournament honors for that season's ACC tournament. In two NCAA tournament games, Rice averaged 24 points.

A highlight of Rice's junior season (2007–08) was a career-high 46-point performance in a 90–80 home loss to North Carolina on March 1, 2008. He scored 34 points by halftime. Rice averaged 21.0 points, 3.3 rebounds and 5.0 assists per game. He again earned All-ACC honors, this time on the first team. In a scintillating senior year (2008–09), Rice experienced a dip in his scoring, averaging 16.9 points a game but improved in other statistical categories, averaging 3.8 rebounds and 5.4 assists a game. He scored 9 points in BC's only appearance of the 2009 NCAA tournament.

Professional career
Rice went undrafted in the 2009 NBA draft; he had been projected to be selected in the second round or go undrafted. He then joined the Greek League club Panionios for the 2009–10 season.

Rice played for the Utah Jazz in the Orlando Pro Summer League and later with Sacramento Kings in the NBA Summer League in 2010. He was signed by the Artland Dragons for the 2010–11 season, a team in Germany's Basketball Bundesliga, the top league in the country.

In the 2011–12 season Rice played for Lietuvos rytas of the Lithuanian Basketball League. In 2012–13 season he returned to Germany to play for Bayern Munich.

On July 11, 2013, Rice signed a two-year contract with the Israeli club Maccabi Tel Aviv. In his first season with Maccabi, he won the EuroLeague, with him averaging 9.5 points, 3.2 assists and 2.1 rebounds over 30 games. After beating favored Pallacanestro Olimpia Milano in a dramatic playoff series, Maccabi advanced to the EuroLeague Final Four. In the semifinal game, he was responsible for the 68–67 victory over CSKA Moscow by scoring the game-winner with 5.5 seconds left on the clock. In the championship final game against Real Madrid, he scored 26 points, leading his team to a sixth European title, after an overtime 98-86 victory. For such a performance, he was named the EuroLeague Final Four MVP.

On June 30, 2014, Rice signed a three-year deal with the Russian club Khimki. In the 2014–15 EuroCup season, he was named to the All-EuroCup First Team and selected the EuroCup season MVP. Khimki eventually won the EuroCup, and Rice was named the EuroCup Finals MVP.

On July 26, 2016, Rice signed a two-year contract with FC Barcelona.

On January 15, 2018, Rice parted ways with Barcelona and signed with the Chinese team Shenzhen Leopards for the rest of the season, as a replacement for Keith Langford.

On August 5, 2018, Rice returned to Germany for a third stint, signing a one-year deal with Brose Bamberg. With Bamberg, Rice played in the Basketball Champions League in which he was named the Most Valuable Player of the competition. He led Bamberg to the Final Four, where the team was defeated twice and thus ended in fourth place.

On July 1, 2019, Rice signed with Greek powerhouse Panathinaikos of the Greek Basket League. On December 6, 2019, Rice recorded a career-high 41 points, while shooting 13-of-23 from the field, leading Panathinaikos to a 99–93 overtime win over Olympiacos. In the middle of the year he announced that in the end of season he will end his career despite his age (33). Being a member of Panathinaikos he won the Greek Championship. With the Greens he had 10.1 points, 4.6 assists and 2.3 rebounds per game in A1 League and in Euroleague he had 10.0 points, 2.8 assists and 1.8 rebound per game. On August 17, 2020, Rice signed with AEK Athens.

The Basketball Tournament
Rice led Boeheim's Army to The Basketball Tournament 2021 Championship. He was named MVP of the Tournament.

National team career
In July 2013, Rice received a Montenegrin passport that allowed him to play for the senior men's Montenegrin national team at the EuroBasket 2013. He also played at the EuroBasket 2017.

Career statistics

EuroLeague

|-
| style="text-align:left;background:#afe6ba;"| 2013–14†
| style="text-align:left;"| Maccabi
| 30 || 5 || 20.6 || .409 || .382 || .850 || 2.1 || 3.2 || .6 || .1 || 9.5 || 9.6
|-
| style="text-align:left;"| 2015–16
| style="text-align:left;"| Khimki
| 24 || 23 || 29.2 || .382 || .308 || .814 || 2.1 || 6.1 || 1.2 || .1 || 12.4 || 12.8
|-
| style="text-align:left;"| 2016–17
| style="text-align:left;"| Barcelona
| 30 || 30 || 29.4 || .427 || .320 || .822 || 1.6 || 4.9 || 1.1 || .1 || 13.0 || 10.6

|- class="sortbottom"
| style="text-align:left;"| Career
| style="text-align:left;"|
| 84 || 58 || 26.2 || .407 || .328 || .830 || 1.9 || 4.6 || 1 || .1 || 11.6 || 10.8

Source: EuroLeague

Domestic leagues

Source: RealGM

College

|-
| style="text-align:left;"| 2005–06
| style="text-align:left;"| Boston College
| 36 || 0 || 20.8 || .432 || .391 || .773 || 1.4 || 2.5 || .7 || .1 || 9.3
|-
| style="text-align:left;"| 2006–07
| style="text-align:left;"| Boston College
| 33 || 33 || 36.6 || .458 || .322 || .795 || 3.4 || 5.4 || 1.2 || .3 || 17.6
|-
| style="text-align:left;"| 2007–08
| style="text-align:left;"| Boston College
| 30 || 30 || 38.1 || .433 || .358 || .846 || 3.3 || 5.0 || 1.6 || .2 || 21.0
|-
| style="text-align:left;"| 2008–09
| style="text-align:left;"| Boston College
| 33 || 33 || 33.4 || .413 || .347 || .856 || 3.8 || 5.3 || 1.4 || .2 || 16.9
|- class="sortbottom"
| style="text-align:left;"| Career
| style="text-align:left;"|
| 132 || 96 || 31.8 || .434 || .353 || .825 || 2.9 || 4.5 || 1.2 || .2 || 15.9

References

External links
Tyrese Rice at Boston College Eagles
Tyrese Rice at DraftExpress

Tyrese Rice at RealGM
Tyrese Rice at EuroLeague

1987 births
Living people
Montenegrin men's basketball players
American men's basketball players
American emigrants to Montenegro
African-American basketball players
American expatriate basketball people in China
American expatriate basketball people in Germany
American expatriate basketball people in Greece
American expatriate basketball people in Israel
American expatriate basketball people in Lithuania
American expatriate basketball people in Russia
American expatriate basketball people in Spain
Artland Dragons players
Basketball players from Richmond, Virginia
BC Khimki players
BC Rytas players
Boston College Eagles men's basketball players
FC Barcelona Bàsquet players
FC Bayern Munich basketball players
Greek Basket League players
Israeli Basketball Premier League players
Liga ACB players
Maccabi Tel Aviv B.C. players
Montenegrin people of African-American descent
Naturalized citizens of Montenegro
Panathinaikos B.C. players
Panionios B.C. players
Point guards
Shenzhen Leopards players
21st-century African-American sportspeople
20th-century African-American people